Hoppestad is a village in Skien municipality, Norway. Its population is 444.

References

Villages in Vestfold og Telemark